Simone Mosca (1492–1554) was an Italian sculptor who was born in Settignano (part of Florence).  His sons were sculptors Francesco Mosca, called Il Moschino (ca. 1531-1578) and Simone Simoncelli, also known as Simone Moschino (1533-1610). During the late 1520s and early 1530s Simone worked with Michelangelo on the Medici Chapel in Florence. A Venus by Francesco Moschino was described in 1782 in the Royal Palace of Turin. Simone Mosca died in Orvieto, Italy in 1554.

References 
 Metropolitan Museum of Art, Outstanding Recent Accessions, The Metropolitan Museum of Art Bulletin, New Series, Vol. 30, No. 2 (Oct. - Nov., 1971), 94-96.
 Vasari, Giorgio, Le Vite delle più eccellenti pittori, scultori, ed architettori, many editions and translations.

1492 births
1554 deaths
Sculptors from Florence
16th-century Italian sculptors
Italian male sculptors